K. Depan Sakwati (born 17 October 1987) is a Malaysian football player.

Career
He recently played for MISC-MIFA from 2014 to 2016.
Previously he played for Betaria FC. He also has played for several teams including UPB-MyTeam FC, Malacca FA, Selangor FA and Sarawak FA.

Personal life
He is the older brother of Selangor FA and Malaysia national football team player, K. Gurusamy.

References

External links
 FA SELANGOR - Pemain - Depan Sakwati a/l Kandasamy
 K. Depan Sakwati profile at Goal.com

1987 births
Living people
Malaysian footballers
Malacca FA players
Selangor FA players
Sarawak FA players
People from Selangor
Malaysian people of Indian descent
Association football midfielders